Schmalhausenia is a genus of Asian plants in the thistle tribe within the daisy family.

Species
The only known species is Schmalhausenia nidulans, native to Kazakhstan, Uzbekistan, Kyrgyzstan, and Xinjiang.

References

Cynareae
Asteraceae genera
Flora of Asia